Edward Snell may refer to:

Edward Snell (cricketer) (1906–1973), English cricketer
Edward Snell (engineer) (1820–1880), railway engineer and surveyor

See also
Snell (surname)